West St. Andrews is a community in the Canadian province of Nova Scotia, located in Colchester County. The Community was formerly known as Milltown. The St Andrews River flows through West St Andrews. The river was at one time known as the Wilmot River. West St Andrews neighbors the communities of East Stewiacke, Wittenburg, Coldstream, Lanesville, and The Town of Stewiacke.

Navigator

References
West St. Andrews on Destination Nova Scotia

Communities in Colchester County
General Service Areas in Nova Scotia